Pat O'Kelly (born 31 July 1967 in Dublin) is an Irish former soccer defender  who was a two-time  first team All-American at Seton Hall University. He played two seasons in the American Professional Soccer League and at least four in the USISL.

O'Kelly played for Home Farm as a youth player. He then represented Ireland at the 1985 FIFA World Youth Championship. In 1986, he moved to attend Seton Hall University where he played on the men's soccer team until 1989. He sits fourth on the team's career goals list with 42. He was a 1988 and 1989 first team All-American. In 1990, he signed with the Penn-Jersey Spirit of the American Professional Soccer League (APSL). On March 10, 1994, he signed with the expansion North Jersey Imperials of USISL. In January 1996, O'Kelly attended trials with Major League Soccer. This led to his selection by the MetroStars in the 10th round (99th overall) in the 1996 MLS Inaugural Player Draft, but he chose not to sign with the team. Instead, he signed with the Central Jersey Riptide of the USISL on April 25, 1996 He was selected to the 1996 USISL All Pro League Team, having scored thirteen goals. He continued with the Riptide through at least the 1997 season. In 1998, he played for the South Jersey Barons.

References

External links
 

Living people
1967 births
All-American men's college soccer players
American Professional Soccer League players
Central Jersey Riptide players
Association football defenders
Home Farm F.C. players
North Jersey Imperials players
Penn-Jersey Spirit players
Republic of Ireland association footballers
Seton Hall Pirates men's soccer players
Ocean City Nor'easters players
USISL players